Wüllner or Wuellner is a German surname. People with the surname include:

 Adolf Wüllner (1835–1908), German physicist
 Franz Wüllner (1832–1902), German pianist, conductor, conservatory director and composer, father of Ludwig
 Ludwig Wüllner (1858–1938), German concert and operatic tenor, actor and reciter, son of Franz
 Robert Wuellner (1885–1966), Swiss actor, film producer and director

Surnames